Bostrichoidea is a superfamily of beetles. It is the type superfamily of the infraorder Bostrichiformia.

Description 
The Bostrichoidea are united by the following features: modified cryptonephridism, the structure of the aedeagus in males, and the lack of a basal mandibular mola in larvae.

Aside from this, Bostrichoidea show a range of morphologies. For example, in Bostrichidae alone, the adult body shape varies from convex to flattened, the body length from 2 to 50 mm, and the colour may be yellow, brown or black and sometimes has a metallic hue.

Ecology 
Bostrichoids generally live in dry habitats. For example, many Bostrichidae feed on wood, though some attack monocotyledonous plants as well and Rhyzopertha dominica feeds on stored grains and cereal products. Similarly, most Ptinidae are wood-borers as larvae but some feed on other dry plant or animal material, such as stored foods, tobacco and museum specimens. Dermestidae are typically scavengers on dried organic matter with a high protein content, with some species being predators or feeding on pollen and nectar.

Families and subfamilies 
Bostrichoidea includes the following subgroups:
 Family Bostrichidae Latreille, 1802 - Horned Powder-post Beetles
 Subfamily Bostrichinae Latreille, 1802
 Subfamily Dinoderinae Thomson, 1863
 Subfamily Dysidinae Lesne, 1921
 Subfamily Euderiinae Lesne, 1934
 Subfamily Lyctinae Billberg, 1820 - Powder-post Beetles
 Subfamily Polycaoninae Lesne, 1896
 Subfamily Psoinae Blanchard, 1851
 Family Dermestidae Latreille, 1804 - Carpet Beetles
 Subfamily Attageninae Laporte, 1840
 Subfamily Dermestinae Latreille, 1804
 Subfamily Megatominae Leach, 1815
 Subfamily Orphilinae LeConte, 1861
 Subfamily Thorictinae Agassiz, 1846
 Subfamily Trinodinae Casey, 1900
 Family Endecatomidae LeConte, 1861
 Family Ptinidae Latreille, 1802 (formerly Anobiidae)
 Subfamily Alvarenganiellinae Viana and Martínez, 1971
 Subfamily Anobiinae Fleming, 1821 - Death-watch Beetles
 Subfamily Dorcatominae Thomson, 1859
 Subfamily Dryophilinae Gistel, 1848
 Subfamily Ernobiinae Pic, 1912
 Subfamily Eucradinae LeConte, 1861
 Subfamily Mesocoelopodinae Mulsant and Rey, 1864
 Subfamily Ptilininae Shuckard, 1839
 Subfamily Ptininae Latreille, 1802 - Spider Beetles
 Subfamily Xyletininae Gistel, 1848

References

External links

 
Beetle superfamilies